Anaikuttam Dam is a dam situated in Tamil Nadu in Virudhunagar district. The dam is built on the Arjuna River. Anaikuttam Dam finished the construction in the year 1989. It is an earthen irrigation dam with a length of 2940 meters and height of 9.5 meters. The dam provides drinking water to the Virudhunagar district. According to a news article published in 2020, the dam had the capacity to give 2 million litres of water to Virudhunagar every day. In 2015, an investigation was launched against the Public Work Department (PWD) officials for not maintaining the dam which was making all the water of the dam going to waste.

References 

Virudhunagar district
Dams in Tamil Nadu